Granite Mountain is a  double summit mountain located  south of Stevens Pass on the common border of Kittitas County and Chelan County in Washington state. Granite Mountain is the highest point on the Hyas Lake-French Creek divide with precipitation runoff from the mountain draining west into Cle Elum River, or east into French Creek, a tributary of Icicle Creek. Its subsidiary 7,080-ft South Peak is positioned half a mile to the south-southeast, the nearest higher neighbor is The Cradle,  to the southeast, and Mac Peak is set  to the north-northwest. The Pacific Crest Trail skirts below the western base this peak.

Climate

Most weather fronts originate in the Pacific Ocean, and travel northeast toward the Cascade Mountains. As fronts approach, they are forced upward by the peaks of the Cascade Range, causing them to drop their moisture in the form of rain or snowfall onto the Cascades (Orographic lift). As a result, the west side of the Cascades experiences high precipitation, especially during the winter months in the form of snowfall. During winter months, weather is usually cloudy, but, due to high pressure systems over the Pacific Ocean that intensify during summer months, there is often little or no cloud cover during the summer. The months June through September offer the most favorable weather for viewing or climbing this peak.

Geology

The Alpine Lakes Wilderness features some of the most rugged topography in the Cascade Range with craggy peaks and ridges, deep glacial valleys, and granite walls spotted with over 700 mountain lakes.  Geological events occurring many years ago created the diverse topography and drastic elevation changes over the Cascade Range leading to the various climate differences.

The history of the formation of the Cascade Mountains dates back millions of years ago to the late Eocene Epoch. With the North American Plate overriding the Pacific Plate, episodes of volcanic igneous activity persisted. In addition, small fragments of the oceanic and continental lithosphere called terranes created the North Cascades about 50 million years ago.

During the Pleistocene period dating back over two million years ago, glaciation advancing and retreating repeatedly scoured and shaped the landscape. The last glacial retreat in the Alpine Lakes area began about 14,000 years ago and was north of the Canada–US border by 10,000 years ago. The "U"-shaped cross section of the river valleys are a result of that recent glaciation. Uplift and faulting in combination with glaciation have been the dominant processes which have created the tall peaks and deep valleys of the Alpine Lakes Wilderness area.

See also

List of peaks of the Alpine Lakes Wilderness

References

External links
 Weather forecast:  National Weather Service
 Alpine Lakes Wilderness (Okanogan-Wenatchee National Forest) U.S. Forest Service

Mountains of Washington (state)
Mountains of Kittitas County, Washington
Mountains of Chelan County, Washington
Cascade Range
Wenatchee National Forest
North American 2000 m summits